TVO is a Canadian television network, formerly named TVOntario. It may also refer to:

Television
 TV Osaka, a Japanese television station
 Televisora de Oriente, a Venezuelan television station
 TVQ, which carried the on air branding of TV0 between 1983 and 1988

Other uses
 Teollisuuden Voima, a Finnish nuclear power company
 Theatre Versus Oppression, a UK-registered charity which uses applied theatre techniques
 Total value of ownership, an evaluation method
 Tractor vaporising oil, an engine fuel for British tractors
 Total viable organism, a term for determining the microbial content of a sample
 Tom Voltaire Okwalinga, Ugandan social media personality
 Petrol-paraffin engine or TVO engine, a dual-fuel internal combustion engine

See also
 tvOS, an Apple operating system